Francisco Ayala may refer to:

 Francisco Ayala (novelist) (1906–2009), Spanish novelist
 Francisco J. Ayala (1934–2023), Spanish-American biologist and philosopher
 Francisco Ayala (footballer) (born 1989), Chilean footballer